The Atlantic Coast restingas is an ecoregion of the tropical and subtropical moist broadleaf forests biome, and the South American Atlantic Forest biome. It is located along Brazil's Atlantic coast, from the country's northeast to its southeast.

Restingas are coastal forests which form on sandy, acidic, and nutrient-poor soils, and are characterized by medium-sized trees and shrubs adapted to the dry and nutrient-poor conditions found there.

Setting

The northernmost enclave is in Rio Grande do Norte state in northeastern Brazil. Other enclaves are north and south of the city of Salvador and near the mouth of the Jequitinhonha River in Bahia state; north and south of the mouth of the Rio Paraíba do Sul in Rio de Janeiro state; and along the coast of southern Santa Catarina state and Rio Grande do Sul state, as far as the Uruguayan border.

See also
List of plants of Atlantic Forest vegetation of Brazil — flora of its diverse ecoregions.
Ecoregions in the Atlantic Forest biome
List of ecoregions in Brazil

External links

  CONAMA (1999) Resolução 07 de 23 de julho de 1996

References

Atlantic Forest
Ecoregions of Brazil
Forests of Brazil
Environment of Bahia
Environment of Rio de Janeiro (state)
Environment of Rio Grande do Norte
Environment of Rio Grande do Sul
Environment of Santa Catarina (state)
.

Neotropical tropical and subtropical moist broadleaf forests